Peng Bunchay (born April 22, 1992 in Cambodia) is a footballer for Western Phnom Penh in the Cambodian League.

Honours

Club
Phnom Penh Crown
Cambodian League: 2008,2010,2011
Hun Sen Cup: 2008,2009
2011 AFC President's Cup: Runner up
Boeung Ket Rubber Field
Cambodian League: 2012

Individual
Cambodian League Best Goalkeeper: 2011,2012

References

External links
 

1992 births
Living people
Cambodian footballers
Cambodia international footballers
Phnom Penh Crown FC players
Boeung Ket Rubber Field players
Association football goalkeepers